Torynobelodon was a genus of large herbivorous mammal related to the elephant (order Proboscidea). It lived during the late Miocene Epoch in Asia and North America.

Taxonomy
Shoshani (1996) placed Torynobelodon as a synonym of Platybelodon, but Lambert and Shoshani (1998) considered it morphologically distinct to be a separate genus. A 2016 cladistic study found it to be more primitive than either Platybelodon and Aphanobelodon.

See also

Gnathabelodon
Eubelodon
Serbelodon
Amebelodon
Konobelodon
Platybelodon

References

Amebelodontidae
Miocene proboscideans
Messinian genus extinctions
Miocene mammals of Asia
Miocene mammals of North America
Prehistoric elephants
Prehistoric placental genera
Langhian genus first appearances
Fossil taxa described in 1929